Guibemantis bicalcaratus is a species of frog in the family Mantellidae.
It is endemic to Madagascar.
Its natural habitats are subtropical or tropical moist lowland forests, subtropical or tropical moist montane forests, and plantations .
It is threatened by habitat loss.

Description 
Guibemantis bicalcaratus measures from 22 to 26 mm in length for males, and 24 to 29 mm for females. Its back is clear-brown to yellowish, with small dark spots and sometimes a clear line on each side of the back. A brown line is often present from the snout to the eardrum. Its belly is uniformly clear.

References

Sources
 Nussbaum, R. & Raxworthy, C. 2004.  Mantidactylus bicalcaratus.   2006 IUCN Red List of Threatened Species.   Downloaded on 23 July 2007.

Mantellidae
Endemic frogs of Madagascar
Taxonomy articles created by Polbot
Amphibians described in 1913